The Sikh Misls (derived from the Arabic word مِثْل meaning 'equal'; sometimes spelt as Misal) were the twelve sovereign states of the Sikh Confederacy, which rose during the 18th century in the Punjab region in the northern part of the Indian subcontinent and is cited as one of the causes of the weakening of the Mughal Empire prior to Nader Shah's invasion of India in 1738–1740.

The misls formed a commonwealth that was described by Swiss adventurer Antoine Polier as a natural "aristocratic republic". Although the misls were unequal in strength, and each misl attempted to expand its territory and access to resources at the expense of others, they acted in unison in relation to other states. The misls held biannual meetings of their legislature, the Sarbat Khalsa in Amritsar.

History

In order to withstand the persecution of Shah Jahan and other Mughal rulers, several of the later Sikh Gurus established military forces and fought the Mughal Empire and Hindu hill chiefs in the early and middle Mughal-Sikh Wars. Banda Singh Bahadur continued Sikh resistance to the Mughal Empire until his defeat at the Battle of Gurdas Nangal.

For several years Sikhs found refuge in the jungles and the Himalayan foothills until they organized themselves into military bands known as jathas.

List of misls

Military

Each Misl was made up of members of soldiers, whose loyalty was given to the Misl's leader. A Misl could be composed of a few hundred to tens of thousands of soldiers. Any soldier was free to join whichever Misl he wished, and was free to cancel his membership of the Misl to whom he belonged. He could, if he wanted, cancel his membership of his old Misl and join another. The Barons would allow their armies to combine or coordinate their defences together against a hostile force if ordered by the Misldar Supreme Commander. These orders were only issued in military matters affecting the whole Sikh community. These orders would normally be related to defense against external threats, such as Afghan military attacks. The profits of a fighting action were divided by the misls to individuals based on the service rendered after the conflict using the sardari system.

The Sikh Confederacy is a description of the political structure, of how all the Barons' Kingdoms interacted with each other politically together in Punjab. Although misls varied in strength, the use of primarily light cavalry with a smaller amount heavy cavalry was uniform throughout all of the Sikh misls. Cavalrymen in a misl were required to supply their own horses and equipment. A standard cavalryman was armed with a spear, matchlock, and scimitar. How the armies of the Sikh misls received payment varied with the leadership of each misl. The most prevalent system of payment was the 'Fasalandari' system; soldiers would receive payment every six months at the end of a harvest.

Cavalry tactics

Fauja Singh considers the Sikh misls to be guerrilla armies, although he notes that the Sikh misls generally had greater numbers and a larger number of artillery pieces than a guerrilla army would. The misls were primarily cavalry based armies and employed less artillery than Mughal or Maratha armies. The misls adapted their tactics to their strength in cavalry and weakness in artillery and avoided pitched battles. Misls organized their armies around bodies of horsemen and their units fought battles in a series of skirmishes, a tactic which gave them an advantage over fighting pitched battles. Bodies of cavalry would attack a position, retreat, reload their muskets, and return to attack it again. The tactics used by misl field armies include flanking an enemy, obstructing river passages, cutting off a unit from its supplies, intercepting messengers, attacking isolated units like foraging parties, employing hit-and-run tactics, overrunning camps, and attacking baggage trains. To fight large armies the misl would completely evacuate the areas in front of the enemy's marching route but follow in the rear of the opposition and reconquer areas the enemy had just captured, threaten agents of the enemy with retribution, and sweep over the countryside in the wake of the enemy's withdrawal.

The Running Skirmish was a tactic unique to the Sikh cavalrymen which was notable for its effectiveness and the high degree of skill required to execute it. George Thomas and George Forster, contemporary writers who witnessed it described its use separately in their accounts of the military of the Sikhs. George Forster noted:

"A party from forty to fifty, advance in a quick pace to a distance of carbine shot from the enemy and then, that the fire may be given with the greatest certainty, the horses are drawn up and their pieces discharged, when speedily, retiring about a 100 paces, they load and repeat the same mode of annoying the enemy. Their horses have been so expertly trained to a performance of this operation that on receiving a stroke of hand, they stop from a full canter."

Administration

The Sikh Misls had four different classes of administrative divisions. The patadari, misaldari, tabadari, and jagirdari were the different systems of land tenure used by the misls, and land granted by the misl left the responsibility of establishing law and order to the owner of the land. The land under the direct administration of the chief of the misl was known as the sardari and the tabadari and jagirdari systems used land directly given by the chief from the sardari. The patadari and misaldari systems formed the basis of a misl, while tabadari and jagirdari lands would only be created after large acquisitions of land. The type of system that was used in an area depended on the importance of the chief sardar of the area to the rest of the misl.

The Patadari system affected newly annexed territories and was the original method used by the misls in administrating land. The patadari system relied on the cooperation of surkundas, the rank of a leader of a small party of cavalrymen. The chief of the misl would take his/her portion and divide the other parcels among his Sardars proportional to the number of cavalrymen they had contributed to the misl. The Sardars would then divide their parcels among their Surkundas, and then the Surkundas subdivided the land they received among their individual cavalrymen. The Surkundas receiving parcels of land with settlements were required to fortify them and establish fines and laws for their zamindars and ryots. Parcels of land in the patadari system could not be sold, but could be given to relatives in an inheritance. The soldiers who received parcels from the Patadari system held their land in complete freedom.

The Misaldari system applied to sardars with a small number of cavalrymen as well as independent bodies of cavalrymen who voluntarily attached themselves to a misl. They kept the lands they held before joining the misl as an allotment for their cooperation with the misl. The leaders of these groups, called misaldars, could transfer their allegiance and land to another misl without punishment.

The Tabadari system referred to land under the control of a misl's tabadars. Tabadars served a similar function to retainers in Europe. They were required to serve as cavalrymen to the misl and were subservient to the misl's leader. Although tabadars received their land as a reward, their ownership was subject entirely on the misl's leader. The tabadari grants were only hereditary on the choice of the chief of the misl.

The Jagirdari system used the grant of jagirs by the chief of the misl. Jagirs were given by the chief of the misl to relations, dependents, and people who "deserved well". The owners of jagirs were subservient to the chief of the misl as their ownership was subject to his/her needs. Like the Tabadars, jagirdars were subject to personal service when the chief of the misl requested. However, because jagirs entailed more land and profit, they were required to use the money generated by their jagirs to equip and mount a quota of cavalrymen depending on the size of their jagir. Jagirdari grants were hereditary in practice but a misl's chief could revoke the rights of the heir. Upon the death of the owner of a tabadari or jagadari grant, the land would revert to direct control of the chief (sardari).

The Rakhi system was the payment-for-protection tributary protectorate scheme practiced by the Dal Khalsa of the Sikh Confederacy in the 18th century. It was a large source of income to the Sikh Misls.

Territory

The two main divisions in territory between the misls were between those who were in the Malwa region and those who were in the Majha region. While eleven of the misls were north of the Sutlej river, one, the Phulkian Misl was south of the Sutlej. The Sikhs north of the Sutlej river were known as the Majha Sikhs while the Sikhs that lived south of the Sutlej river were known as the Malwa Sikhs. In the smaller territories were the Dhanigeb Singhs in the Sind Sagar Doab, the Gujrat Singhs in the Jech Doab, the Dharpi Singhs in the Rechna Doab, and the Doaba Singhs in the Jalandhar Doab.

Sikh women in state affairs

 Mai Fateh Kaur (d.1773) of Patiala Sikh dynasty
 Mai Desan Kaur (d.1778) of Sukerchakia Sikh Misl
 Bibi Rajinder Kaur (1739–1791) of Patiala Sikh dynasty
 Mai Sukkhan Kaur (r.1802) of Bhangi Sikh Misl
 Mai Lachhmi Kaur of Bhangi Sikh Misl
 Rani Sada Kaur (1762–1832) of Kanhaiya Sikh Misl
 Bibi Rattan Kaur of Dallewalia Sikh Misl
 Mai Karmo Kaur of Nakai Sikh Misl 
 Bibi Sahib Kaur (1771–1801) of Patiala Sikh dynasty
 Maharani Datar Kaur of Sikh Empire (maiden name Raj Kaur of Nakai Misl) (1784–1838)
 Rani Aus Kaur (1772–1821) of Patiala Sikh dynasty
 Maharani Jind Kaur (1817–1863) of Sikh Empire
 Bibi Daya Kaur (d.1823) of Nishanwalia Sikh Misl
 Rani Desa Kaur Nabha of Nabha Sikh dynasty
 Bibi Khem Kaur Dhillon Of Sikh Empire
 Maharani Chand Kaur (1802–1842) of Sikh Empire

Battles fought by Sikhs
 Battle of Rohilla
 Battle of Kartarpur
 Battle of Amritsar (1634)
 Battle of Lahira
 Battle of Bhangani
 Battle of Nadaun
 Battle of Guler (1696)
 Battle of Basoli
 First Battle of Anandpur
 Battle of Nirmohgarh (1702)
 Second Battle of Anandpur
 Second Battle of Chamkaur (1704)
 Battle of Muktsar
 Battle of Sonepat
 Battle of Ambala
 Battle of Samana
 Battle of Chappar Chiri
 Battle of Sadhaura
 Battle of Rahon (1710)
 Battle of Lohgarh
 Battle of Jammu
 Battle of Jalalabad (1710)
 Siege of Gurdaspur or Battle of Gurdas Nangal
 Battle of Manupur (1748)
 Battle of Amritsar (1757)
 Battle of Lahore (1759)
 Battle of Sialkot (1761)
 Battle of Gujranwala (1761)
 Sikh Occupation of Lahore
 Sikh holocaust of 1762 or Battle of Kup
 Battle of Harnaulgarh
 Battle of Amritsar (1762)
 Battle of Sialkot (1763)
 Battle of Sirhind (1764)
 Battle of Delhi (1783)
 Battle of Amritsar(1797)
 Gurkha-Sikh War
 Battles of Sialkot
 Battle of Jammu (1808)
 Battle of Attock
 Battle of Multan
 Battle of Shopian
 Battle of Balakot
 Battle of Peshawar (1834)
 Battle of Jamrud
 Sino-Sikh War
 Battle of Mudki
 Battle of Ferozeshah
 Battle of Baddowal
 Battle of Aliwal
 Battle of Sobraon
 Battle of Chillianwala
 Battle of Ramnagar
 Siege of Multan
 Battle of Gujrat

See also

 Dal Khalsa, the military forces of the Sikh Confederacy
 History of Punjab
 Jat Mahasabha
 Khap

Bibliography

 
 
 
 
 
 
 
 
 
 
 Ahmad Shah Batalia, Appendix to Sohan Lal Suri's Umdat-ut-Tawarikh. Daftar I, Lahore, 1X85, p. 15; Bute Shahs Tawarikh-i-Punjab, Daftar IV, (1848), (MS., Ganda Singh's personal collection. Patiala), p. 6; Kanaihya Lal, Tarikh-i-Punjab, Lahore, 1877, p. 88; Ali-ud-Din Mufti, Ibratnama, Vol. I, (1854), Lahore, 1961, p. 244. Muhammad Latif, History of the Punjab (1891), Delhi, 1964, p. 296.
 Ian Heath, The Sikh Army, 1799–1849 (Men-at-arms), Osprey (2005) 
 Harbans Singh, The Heritage of the Sikhs, second rev. ed., Manohar (1994) 
 Hari Ram Gupta, History of the Sikhs: Sikh Domination of the Mughal Empire, 1764–1803, second ed., Munshiram Manoharlal (2000) 
 Hari Ram Gupta, History of the Sikhs: The Sikh Commonwealth or Rise and Fall of the Misls, rev. ed., Munshiram Manoharlal (2001)  
 Gian Singh, Tawarikh Guru Khalsa, (ed. 1970), p. 261.

Notes

References

 
History of Sikhism
Sikh Empire
Sikh warriors